Muli Katzurin (born November 30, 1954) is an Israeli basketball coach, who since early 2008 has been coach of the national basketball team of Poland. Katzurin for twenty years (late 1970s–late 1990s) coached various Israeli teams, such as Hapoel Tel Aviv and Maccabi Tel Aviv. Katzurin also coached Israel National Team in the years 1997–2004. In 1999, he accepted offer from Śląsk Wrocław and came to Poland. Between 2006 and 2008, he coached a Czech team CEZ Basketball Nymburk, then in early 2008 was named coach of the national team of Poland, replacing a Slovenian, Andrej Urlep. In January 2011 he was named as the head coach of the German team ALBA Berlin. In 2012 he was named as head coach of the German team Frankfurt Skyliners for 2 years. In 2014 he was named as head coach of the Israeli team Bnei-Herzelia. in 2015 he was named as head coach of the German team Eisbären Bremerhaven.

References

1954 births
Living people
Israeli basketball coaches
Alba Berlin basketball coaches
Skyliners Frankfurt coaches
Basketball Nymburk coaches
Israeli expatriate basketball people in Germany
Israeli expatriate basketball people in the Czech Republic
Israeli expatriate basketball people in Poland